Whether the Weather is Fine or Kun Maupay Man It Panahon is a 2021 drama film directed and co-written by Carlo Francisco Manatad in his feature directorial debut. The film is a disaster movie which combines satirical and surreal elements. Starring Daniel Padilla, Rans Rifol, and Charo Santos-Concio, the film is set against the backdrop of the devastation caused by the 2013 Typhoon Haiyan in the Philippines. The film is a joint production by Black Sheep Productions, Globe Studios, and Dreamscape Entertainment.

The film had its world premiere on August 9, 2021, at the 74th Locarno Film Festival.

Plot
In the aftermath of the devastating 2013 Typhoon Haiyan, a mother and son struggle for survival while searching for their loved ones.

Cast
 Daniel Padilla as Miguel
 Rans Rifol as Andrea
 Charo Santos-Concio as Norma

Production

Development
Whether the Weather is Fine has been in development since 2014. The project started from a screenplay by Manatad that did not initially use the typhoon as a backdrop. However, the completed film is ultimately based on Manatad's personal experiences of the 2013 typhoon in Tacloban. Manatad's original concept for the film was also more "narrative and dramatic."

The project received the Asian Cinema Fund, for script development, from the Busan International Film Festival in 2014. Manatad and his project were also among the invitees selected in 2016 to be a part of La Fabrique by Les Cinémas du Monde, a professional program collateral to the Cannes Film Festival which helps young directors develop their films.

In 2017, the film participated in the TorinoFilmLab, where it eventually won a TFL Co-Production Award, in the amount of €50K or ₱2.85M. The following year, Whether the Weather is Fine was selected to be a part of the 14th edition of the Cinéfondation L'Atelier, a program under the auspices of the Cannes Film Festival. The film also received the Berlinale's World Cinema Fund and substantial funding from the Aide aux Cinémas du Monde (France's World Cinema Support) and Institut Français, both in 2019. In 2021, the film received a second award from the TorinoFilmLab, the TFL Audience Design Fund.

Through these development labs, as well as Manatad's success in submitting a short film to the Cannes Film Festival (Jodilerks in la Semaine de la Critique in 2017), he was able to attract interested producers to the project. The film ultimately became a co-production between six different countries, and its international rights were picked up by Beijing-based distributor Rediance.

Casting
Manatad has described the cast as a "good mix", as it includes a veteran actress (Santos-Concio), a popular actor (Padilla), and a rising talent (Rifol). Manatad had long wanted to work with Padilla, but was uncertain if he would be able to secure him for the project. Padilla, who is mostly known for his love team romantic comedies and dramas with actress Kathryn Bernardo, did not join the project immediately. Concerned that the material was too heavy and that he would not be able to give justice to the role, Padilla eventually accepted the role after being given two weeks to decide by Manatad. Manatad has stated that Padilla was able to embody his character more easily because he is a native speaker of Waray.

The film also features actress Rans Rifol in her film debut. Rifol was formerly with the Filipina girl group MNL48 before switching to acting.

Filming
Principal photography for the film was completed in February 2020.

Release
The film had its world premiere on August 9, 2021, at the 74th Locarno Film Festival, where it won the Cinema e Gioventù Prize. The film also screened at the 2021 Toronto International Film Festival in the Contemporary World Cinema section. Whether the Weather is Fine had its US premiere at the Chicago International Film Festival.

The film premiered in the Philippines on December 25, 2021, as an official entry to the 47th Metro Manila Film Festival.

Accolades

References 

2021 films
2021 drama films
2020s disaster films
Disaster films based on actual events
Drama films based on actual events
Films about families
Films set in 2013
Films set in the Philippines
Philippine disaster films
Star Cinema films
Typhoon Haiyan